¿Quién eres tú? ('Infringement) (also known in developing as La Otra Cara) is a 2012 Spanish-language telenovela produced by RTI Producciones and Televisa for Mexico-based television network Gala TV and United States-based television network UniMás (formally Telefutura). It is a remake of La usurpadora.

Julian Gil stars as the protagonist, while Laura Carmine stars as the dual protagonist/antagonist, portraying twin sisters Natalia and Veronica.

History
A January 7, 2013 airdate was confirmed by UniMás (previously Telefutura) on December 12, 2012. From January 7 to January 18, 2013, UniMás broadcast ¿Quién Eres Tú? weeknights at 10pm/9c. It was removed from the airwaves after only ten episodes due to low ratings. As of January 21, 2013, UniMás is airing Rosario Tijeras weeknights at 10pm/9c, replacing ¿Quién Eres Tú?.

Cast

Main Cast

Special Cast

Broadcasters

References 

2012 telenovelas
RTI Producciones telenovelas
Televisa telenovelas
Colombian telenovelas
Spanish-language American telenovelas
Mexican telenovelas
2012 Colombian television series debuts
2013 Colombian television series endings
2012 Mexican television series debuts
2013 Mexican television series endings
2012 American television series debuts
2013 American television series endings
Mexican television series based on Venezuelan television series
American television series based on Venezuelan television series
Television series about twins